The 1995 Asian Club Championship was the 15th edition of the annual international club football competition held in the AFC region (Asia). It determined that year's club champion of association football in Asia.

Ilhwa Chunma of South Korea won the final and became Asian champions for the first time.

First round

West Asia

|}
1 Al-Arabi had been drawn against the champions of Bahrain, but the Bahrainian FA did not send a team. 
2 Al-Nasr were drawn against the champions of Palestine, but the Palestinian FA did not send a team. 
3 Saipa were drawn against the champions of Tajikistan, but the Tajik FA did not send a team.

East Asia

|}
1 Saunders SC withdrew after the 1st leg. 
2 GD Lam Pak withdrew after the  1st leg. 
3 Cảng Sài Gòn withdrew. 
4 Thai Farmers Bank FC had been drawn against the winners of a match between the champions of China and North Korea, but neither country's FA sent a team.

Second round

West Asia

|}
1 Yelimay Semipalatinsk withdrew after the 1st leg.

East Asia

|}
1 Crescent Textile withdrew after the 1st leg.

Quarterfinals

West Asia

All matches were played in Riyadh, Saudi Arabia.

East Asia

All matches were played in Bandung, Indonesia.

Semifinals

Third place match

Final

References
Asian Club Competitions 1996 at RSSSF.com

1995 in Asian football
1995